Jean-Marie Huriez (born 7 March 1971) is a French professional football coach and former player who played as a defender. As of 2022, he is an assistant coach at Ligue 2 club Dijon.

References

External links
Jean-Marie Huriez profile at chamoisfc79.fr

1971 births
Living people
French footballers
Association football defenders
Chamois Niortais F.C. players
AS Nancy Lorraine players
SO Châtellerault players
UA Cognac players
AS Cherbourg Football players
Ligue 2 players
Ligue 1 players
Championnat National players
Division d'Honneur players
Championnat National 3 players
Championnat National 2 players
French football managers
Association football coaches
AS Cherbourg Football non-playing staff
AS Cherbourg Football managers
Stade Malherbe Caen non-playing staff
Toulouse FC non-playing staff
Dijon FCO players